Hiro (born October 11, 1985) is a Japanese music producer, associated with production company Digz, inc. He began producing songs in 2007, beginning with dance group PaniCrew's single "Growing & Leaning." His most successful song is currently Kumi Koda's "Taboo," which reached #1 on Oricon's single charts in 2008. Other high-profile songs of Hiros include Kumi Koda's  "Universe" and "Your Love," Namie Amuro's "My Love," BoA's "Best Friend" and Koichi Domoto of KinKi Kids' "Lose Control" (all appearing on albums reaching #1 on Oricon charts).

Biography

From the age of 15, Hiro took an interest in audio editing software. While on an exchange trip to England, he performed in a church choir and worked on making his own album (of which 300 copies were printed). In 2007, after graduating from an Australian university, he moved back to Japan and begun full-time work as a music producer in 2008.

Production discography

References

External links
Hiro Official Website 
Hiro's official blog 
Hiro on Myspace 
Digz, inc (production group site) 

Living people
Japanese record producers
1985 births